4F-MDMB-BINACA (also known as 4F-MDMB-BUTINACA or 4F-ADB) is an indazole-based synthetic cannabinoid from the indazole-3-carboxamide family. It has been used as an active ingredient in synthetic cannabis products and sold as a designer drug since late 2018. 4F-MDMB-BINACA is an agonist of the CB1 receptor (EC50 = 7.39 nM), though it is unclear whether it is selective for this target. In December 2019, the UNODC announced scheduling recommendations placing 4F-MDMB-BINACA into Schedule II throughout the world.

Related compounds
The corresponding indole core analogue, 4F-MDMB-BICA or 4F-MDMB-BUTICA has also been widely sold as a designer drug by chemical providers on the net, first being identified in May 2020.

Legal Status

United Kingdom
It's illegal to sell, distribute, supply, transport or trade the pharmaceutical drug under the Psychoactive Substances Act 2016.

See also
5F-MDMB-PINACA
5F-MDMB-PICA
5F-MMB-PINACA
5F-MPP-PICA
AB-FUBINACA

References

Cannabinoids
Designer drugs
Organofluorides
Indazolecarboxamides
Tert-butyl compounds